The Manipur women's football team is an Indian women's football team representing Manipur in the Senior Women's National Football Championship. They have appeared in the Women's National Championship finals twenty five times, and have been the most successful state team by winning the championship for a record 21 times.

Honours

State
Senior Women's National Football Championship
 Winners (21): 1992–93, 1994–95, 1995–96, 1997–98, 1998–99, 1999–2000, 2000–01, 2001–02, 2002–03, 2003–04, 2004–05, 2005–06, 2006–07, 2007–08, 2008–09, 2009–10, 2013–14, 2016–17, 2018–19, 2019–20, 2021–22
 Runners-up (4): 1991–92, 1996–97, 2015–16, 2017–18
National Games
 Gold medal (5): 1999, 2001, 2002, 2015, 2022
 Silver medal (2): 2007, 2011
 Junior Girl's National Football Championship
 Winners (9): 2002–03, 2003–04, 2005–06, 2006–07, 2007–08, 2010–11, 2013–14, 2015–16, 2017–18
 Runners-up (2): 2001–02, 2018–19
 Sub–Junior Girl's National Football Championship
 Winners (5): 2003–04, 2004–05, 2008–09, 2009–10, 2018–19
 Runners-up (2): 2006–07, 2017–18

Others
Pem Dorjee Memorial Cup
 Winners: 2009

References

Football in Manipur
Women's football teams in India
Year of establishment missing